The Premier of Sarawak is the head of government in the Malaysian state of Sarawak. The premier is appointed by the Yang di-Pertua Negeri, also known as the state's governor. The premier is also the leader of the political party or coalition able to secure a majority in the Sarawak State Legislative Assembly.

This office was known as Chief Minister of Sarawak before an amendment to the state constitution regarding the matter was successfully passed on 15 February 2022, renaming the post to "premier". The constitutional amendment was gazetted and came into effect on 1 March 2022.

The incumbent premier of Sarawak is Abang Abdul Rahman Zohari Abang Openg, who took office on 13 January 2017 (as the chief minister).

History 

The post of Premier of Sarawak was created as Chief Minister of Sarawak on 22 July 1963 when Sarawak was given self-government, with Stephen Kalong Ningkan being the first inaugural to lead the office.

A proposal to change the title of Chief Minister to Premier was made in February 2022, as an aspect of Sarawak's efforts to reclaim its rights under the 1963 Malaysia Agreement (MA63). In addition, the office was proposed to be renamed so that Sarawak would not be compared to other states like Penang and Malacca, which also have a chief minister to lead their state government. Along with Britain, Singapore, the Federation of Malaya, and Sabah, Sarawak was one of the signatories of MA63 during the formation of Malaysia.

On 15 February, the position of Chief Minister was changed to Premier following a successful amendment to the Sarawak state constitution. The constitutional amendment was gazetted and came into effect on 1 March. Abang Abdul Rahman Zohari Abang Openg, who had previously served as the sixth Chief Minister before the post was rebranded, became the first Premier of Sarawak.

Appointment 
According to the Article 3(6)(a) of the Constitution of the State of Sarawak, the governor shall first appoint the premier to preside over the Cabinet and requires such premier to be a member of the Legislative Assembly who, in the former's judgment, is likely to command the confidence of the majority of the members of the state assembly. The premier must not be a Malaysian by naturalisation or registration.

The governor will appoint not more than ten nor less than four Ministers on the premier's advice. The governor will also appoint deputy ministers under Article 7A of the state constitution. 

The Premier and the Cabinet Ministers must take and subscribe in the presence of the Yang di-Pertua Negeri the oath of office and allegiance as well as the oath of secrecy before they can exercise the functions of office. In line with the Westminster system's principles of "collective responsibility" codified in the State Constitution, the Cabinet is collectively responsible to the State Legislative Assembly. The members of the Cabinet are prohibited from holding any office of profit and engage in any trade, business or profession that will cause conflict of interest. Unlike the Premier, State Ministers and Assistant Ministers hold office at the pleasure of the Yang di-Pertua Negeri Articles 7(3) and 7A(3), Sarawak State Constitution.

If a government cannot get its appropriation (budget) legislation passed by the Legislative Assembly, or the Legislative Assembly passes a vote of "no confidence" in the government, the Premier is bound by convention to resign immediately. The Yang di-Pertua Negeri's choice of replacement chief minister will be dictated by the circumstances. Ministers other than the Premier shall hold office during the pleasure of the Yang di-Pertua Negeri, unless the appointment of any Minister shall have been revoked by the Yang di-Pertua Negeri on the advice of the Premier but may at any time resign his office.

Following a resignation in other circumstances, defeated in an election or the death of a premier, the Yang di-Pertua Negeri will generally appoint as Premier the person voted by the governing party as their new leader.

Powers
The Premier is the Head of Government in the State of Sarawak. Both the Federal Constitution and State Constitution as well as other legislations accord various authorities upon the office of the Premier.

Specific provisions of the State Constitution that expresses the authority of the Premier include:-

 Art. 1(1): Consulting with the Yang Di-Pertua Agong on the appointment of Governor;
 Art. 1(3): Consulting with the Yang Di-Pertuan Agong on the appointment of the Acting Governor;
 Art. 1(5): Advising Governor, with the consent of the Yang Di-Pertuan Agong, appointing a person taking the Governor place or representing the Governor at the Conference of Rulers;
 Art. 6(3)(b): Advising Governor the appointment of Cabinet Ministers and Deputy Ministers;
 Art. 7(1): Request for the dissolution of the State Legislative Assembly;
 Art. 7(2): Advising the Governor on the revocation of the appointment of a Cabinet Minister;
 Art. 11: Advising Governor on the appointment of the State Secretary, State Attorney General, and State Financial Secretary;
 Art. 15(1)(a) & (b): Advising the Governor on the appointment of the Speaker and Deputy Speaker of the State Legislative Assembly; and
 Art. 35(1): Advising Governor on the appointment of the Chairman, Deputy chairman, and members of the State Public Service Commission.

The power of the premier is subject to a number of limitations. Premiers removed as leader of his or her party, or whose government loses a vote of no confidence in the Legislative Assembly, must advise a state election or resign the office or be dismissed by Governor. The defeat of a supply bill (one that concerns the spending of money) or unable to pass important policy-related legislation is seen to require the resignation of the government or dissolution of Legislative Assembly, much like a non-confidence vote, since a government that cannot spend money is hamstrung, also called loss of supply.

The premier's party will normally have a majority in the Legislative Assembly and party discipline is exceptionally strong in Sarawakian politics, so passage of the government's legislation through the Legislative Assembly is mostly a formality.

Caretaker Premier 
The legislative assembly unless sooner dissolved by the Yang di-Pertua Negeri with His Excellency's own discretion on the advice of the premier shall continue for five years from the date of its first meeting. The state constitution permits a delay of 90 days of general election to be held from the date of dissolution and the legislative assembly shall be summoned to meet on a date not later than 120 days from the date of dissolution. Conventionally, between the dissolution of one legislative assembly and the convening of the next, the premier and the cabinet remain in office in a caretaker capacity.

List

Chief Ministers of Sarawak (1963–2022) 
Colour key (for political coalitions):
 (3) 
 (4) 
 (1)

Premiers of Sarawak (2022–present) 
Colour key (for political coalitions): 
 (1)

Life after office 
A few former chief ministers had important careers after leaving office. Usually, they are appointed to become governors (Yang di-Pertua Negeri). There are two former chief ministers who were appointed governors shortly after they left office: Abdul Rahman Ya'kub and Abdul Taib Mahmud.

, there is only one former chief minister still alive: Abdul Taib Mahmud. He is currently serving as the seventh governor of Sarawak.

The most recent death of a chief minister was Adenan Satem (served from 2014 to 2017), on 11 January 2017, aged 72. He was also the first chief minister to die in office.

See also
Constitution of the State of Sarawak

References